Sudeley is a civil parish in the district of Tewkesbury, in the county of Gloucestershire, England. The parish includes the village of Charlton Abbots.

History 
The parish was formed on 1 April 1935 from the parishes of Charlton Abbots and Sudeley Manor and part of Sevenhampton. The name "Sudeley" means 'South wood/clearing' or perhaps, 'shed wood/clearing'. Sudeley was recorded in the Domesday Book as Sudlege.

Places of interest  
The parish is home to Sudeley Castle a Grade I listed listed building.

References

External links

Civil parishes in Gloucestershire
Borough of Tewkesbury